Larry L. Naviaux (December 17, 1936 – August 21, 2021) was an American football player and coach. He served as the head football coach at Boston University from 1969 to 1972 and at the University of Connecticut from 1973 to 1976, compiling a career college football coaching record of 37–45–1. Naviaux played college football as a halfback from 1956 to 1958 at the University of Nebraska–Lincoln. Prior to taking over at Boston in 1969, Naviaux served as an assistant coach there as well as Nebraska and Southwestern Louisiana.

Naviaux was born on December 17, 1936, in Lexington, Nebraska. He resided in Farmington, Connecticut during his retirement. He died on August 21, 2021.

Head coaching record

References

1936 births
2021 deaths
American football halfbacks
Boston University Terriers football coaches
Louisiana Ragin' Cajuns football coaches
Nebraska Cornhuskers football players
Nebraska Cornhuskers football coaches
UConn Huskies football coaches
People from Farmington, Connecticut
People from Lexington, Nebraska
Coaches of American football from Nebraska
Players of American football from Nebraska